Caleme is a neighborhood located in Teresópolis, Rio de Janeiro state, Brazil.

Due to the January 2011 floods and mudslides, the neighborhood was devastated, and became almost ghost place.

References

Neighbourhoods in Teresópolis